Bitan can refer to:

Bitan, Xindian District, New Taipei, Taiwan
Yeinot Bitan, Israeli supermarket chain
David Bitan, Israeli lawyer and politician
Sylvain Bitan, Turkish athlete